Friedrich is a German given name and the origin of the English Frederick. People with the name include:

Arts 

Friedrich Gorenstein (1932–2002), Russian author and screenwriter
Friedrich Hohe (1802–1870), German lithographer and painter
Friedrich Hölderlin (1770–1843), German poet, one of the key figures in German Romanticism
Friedrich Hundertwasser (1928–2000), Austrian artist and architect, better known as Friedensreich Hundertwasser
Friedrich "Fritz" Lang (1890–1976), film maker
Otto Friedrich Walter (1928–1994), Swiss journalist, author and publisher
Friedrich von Hardenberg (1772–1801), German poet and philosopher, better known as Novalis
Friedrich Schiller (1759–1805), German poet and philosopher

Music 
 Christian Friedrich Johannes Büttner (1979), German DJ, record producer and musician known as TheFatRat 
Georg Friedrich Händel (1685–1759), German, later British, Baroque composer
Friedrich Smetana (1824–1884), Czech composer who pioneered the development of a musical style that became closely identified with his country's aspirations to independent statehood, regarded in his homeland as the father of Czech music

Philosophy 

Friedrich Engels (1820–1895), German political philosopher, communist, social scientist, journalist and businessman, developer of what is now known as Marxist theory and The Communist Manifesto
Friedrich Hayek (1899–1992), Austrian economist and political philosopher
Friedrich Nietzsche (1844–1900), German philosopher, cultural critic, composer, poet, philologist, and Latin and Greek scholar whose work has exerted a profound influence on modern intellectual history
Friedrich Schiller (1759-1805), German poet, philosopher, physician, historian and playwright
Friedrich Schelling (1775-1854), German philosopher of nature, idealism, mythology, and Christianity

Other fields 

Friedrich der Große (1712–1786), King of Prussia, Frederick the Great
Friedrich Sixt von Armin, German general who participated in the Franco-Prussian War and the First World War
Friedrich Wöhler (1800–1882), German chemist who synthesised urea
Archduke Friedrich, Duke of Teschen (1856–1936)
Archduke Friedrich of Austria (1821–1847)
Friedrich Ludwig Abresch (1699–1782), German born Dutch philologist
Friedrich Bergius (1884–1949), German chemist
Johann Friedrich Blumenbach, German physician, naturalist, physiologist, and anthropologist, one of the first to explore the study of the human being as an aspect of natural history
Friedrich Buchardt, Baltic German SS functionary who commanded Vorkommando Moskau, one of the divisions of Einsatzgruppe B, Post-war worked for MI6 (until 1947) and then, presumably, for the CIA
Friedrich Wilhelm Freiherr von Bülow, German General during Napoleonic Wars 
Friedrich Christiansen (1879–1972), German flying ace during World War I and commander of the German Wehrmacht in the occupied Netherlands during World War II
Friedrich Czapek, plant physiologist who developed Czapek medium
Friedrich Dickel (1913–1993), German politician
Friedrich Robert Faehlmann (1798-1850), Estonian writer, medical doctor and philologist, founder of University of Tartu and one of the authors of Kalevipoeg
Friedrich Karl Florian (1894–1975), Gauleiter of Düsseldorf in Nazi Germany
Friedrich Fröbel (1782–1852), German pedagogue
Friedrich Fromm (1888–1945), German army officer, Commander in Chief of the Reserve Army (Ersatzheer), in charge of training and personnel replacement for combat divisions of the German Army, executed for failing to act against the plot of 20 July 1944 to assassinate Hitler
Friedrich Geisshardt (1919–1943), German World War II flying ace
Friedrich von Gerok, German World War I general
Friedrich Goldmann (1941–2009), German composer and conductor
Friedrich August Grotefend (1798–1836), German philologist
Carl Friedrich Goerdeler (1884–1945), monarchist conservative German politician, executive, economist, civil servant, and opponent of the Nazi regime
Friedrich "Fritz" Haarmann (1879-1920), prolific German cannibalistic serial killer, rapist, and fraudster
Friedrich "Fritz" Hartjenstein (1905–1954), German Nazi SS concentration camp commandant
Friedrich Herrlein, German World War II general
Friedrich Hildebrandt (1898–1948), German SS Obergruppenführer, a Gauleiter, executed for war crimes
Friedrich Hirzebruch (1927–2012), German mathematician
Friedrich von Ingenohl (1857–1933), German admiral from Neuwied best known for his command of the German High Seas Fleet at the beginning of World War I
Friedrich Jeckeln (1895–1946), German SS commander during the Nazi era, Higher SS and Police Leader in the occupied Soviet Union during World War, commander of one of the largest collection of Einsatzgruppen death squads, personally responsible for ordering and organizing the deaths of over 100,000 Jews, Romani, and others designated by the Nazis as "undesirables", the principal perpetrator of Rumbula massacre
Friedrich Kellner (1885–1970), mid-level official in Germany who worked as a justice inspector in Mainz and Laubach, best known for his diaries that got published in the original German in 2011 and in English by Cambridge University Press in 2018.
Friedrich Reinhold Kreutzwald (1803-1882), Estonian writer, one of the authors of Kalevipoeg
Friedrich-Wilhelm Krüger (1894–1945), Nazi official and high-ranking member of the SA and the SS, Higher SS and Police Leader in the General Government in German-occupied Poland and one of the major perpetrators of the Holocaust
Friedrich Loeffler (1852–1915), German bacteriologist
Friedrich Kasimir Medikus (1738–1808), German physician and botanist
Friedrich Olbricht (1888–1944), German general during World War II and one of the plotters involved in the 20 July Plot, an attempt to assassinate Hitler in 1944
Friedrich Panzinger (1903–1959), German SS officer during the Nazi era, head of the Reich Main Security Office (Reichssicherheitshauptamt; RSHA) Amt IV A, from September 1943 to May 1944 and the commanding officer of Einsatzgruppe A in the Baltic States and Belarus
Friedrich Paulus (1890–1957), German field marshal during World War II who commanded the 6th Army during the Battle of Stalingrad, one of the principal commanders of Operation Uranus
Friedrich von Rabenau (1884–1945), German General of the Artillery, theologian, and opponent of National Socialism
Friedrich Rainer (1903–1947), Austrian Nazi politician, Gauleiter as well as a state governor of Salzburg and Carinthia
Friedrich Ratzel, German geographer and ethnographer
Friedrich "Fritz" Sauckel, German Nazi politician, Gauleiter of Thuringia and the General Plenipotentiary for Labour Deployment from March 1942 until the end of the Second World War
Friedrich von Scholtz (1851-1927), German general, military leader and army commander
Friedrich Sämisch (1896–1975), German chess player
Friedrich Stieve (1884-1966), German writer and historian
Friedrich Syrup (1881–1945), Nazi jurist and politician 
Friedrich Trump (1869–1918), German-American businessman, grandfather of 45th U.S. president Donald Trump
Friedrich Wetter (born 1928), German Roman Catholic Cardinal

See also
Federico
Fred (disambiguation)
Freddo
Freddy (disambiguation)
Frédéric
Frederick (given name)
Frederico
Fredrik
Fryderyk (given name)
Friedreich
Fried (disambiguation)

German masculine given names